The Horse Racing Hall of Fame is a Japanese horse racing memorial hall which was installed on September 2, 1985 at the JRA Horse Racing Museum, Fuchu, Tokyo. It was founded by Japan Racing Association to honor the achievements of race horses, jockeys and trainers.

Race horses inducted into the Hall of Fame are called Kensho-ba (顕彰馬) while jockeys and trainer are called Kensho-sha (顕彰者) by the Japan Racing Association.

Race horse Nomination 

The selection of a race horse for the Hall of Fame is decided annually by a vote in April. It is voted on by mass communication and newspeople who have been involved in the horse racing news for more than ten years. Racehorses are inducted into the Hall of Fame if they gather over three-quarters of the total vote.

Voters can vote for race horses which:
Have won more than three Grade 1 races.
Have had excellent racing and breeding results (sired a G1 winner more than five or bred G1 winner more than two)
Have had a positive contribution to the racing world or JRA.

Since 2004, an additional rule was introduced: that race horses which retired less than a year or more than 20 years ago cannot be nominated. In that year only, an extra vote was held exclusively for horse which retired more than 20 years (where Takeshiba O was selected).

Most years, there are no horses elected to the Hall of Fame, due to the division of the vote among many horses. In particular, after the retirement of El Condor Pasa in 1999, El Condor Pasa had earned more than half of the total vote most years. Yet no horse was elected until 2004 because Special Week, one of El Condor Pasa's rivals, had earned more than 30 percent of the vote. Hence neither of these horses got over 75% of the vote, and no other horses could since El Condor Pasa and Special Week in conjunction took over 80% of the vote.

Jockeys 
The jockeys who have shown remarkable activity as well as more than 1000 victories are inducted to hall of Fame. The selection was started in 2004.

 Youichi Fukunaga ( 2004)
 Hiroyuki Gohara ( 2014)
 Hiroshi Kawachi  ( 2014)
 Yuuji Nohira ( 2004)
 Yukio Okabe ( 2014)
 Masato Shibata ( 2014)
 Takayoshi Yasuda ( 2004)

Trainers 
Trainers who have won more than 1000 races and who have won more than ten times at the eight biggest races: Tokyo Yushun (Japanese Derby), Satsuki Sho (Japanese 2000 Guineas), Kikuka Sho (Japanese St. Leger), Yushun Himba (Japanese Oaks), Oka Sho (Japanese 1000 Guineas), Tenno Sho (Spring and Autumn) and Arima Kinen, are inducted to hall of Fame. The selection was started in 2004.

See also
 Australian Racing Hall of Fame
 Canadian Horse Racing Hall of Fame
 New Zealand Racing Hall of Fame 
 United States National Museum of Racing and Hall of Fame

Footnotes

References

Hall of Fame - Japan Racing Association (Japaneselanguage)

Horse racing in Japan
Horse racing museums and halls of fame
Museums established in 1985
1985 establishments in Japan
Halls of fame in Japan